The 2013–14 Georgian Cup (also known as the David Kipiani Cup) is the seventieth season overall and the twenty-fourth since independence of the Georgian annual football tournament. The competition began on 21 August 2013 and will end with the final in May 2014. The defending champions are Dinamo Tbilisi, after winning their tenth ever Georgian Cup last season. The winner of the competition will qualify for the second qualifying round of the 2014–15 UEFA Europa League.

First round 
The first legs were held on 21 and 22 August, with the return matches from 17 September.

First legs

Second legs

Second round 
The winners from the first round went through in this round and to be joined at this stage by Chikhura Sachkhere, Dila Gori, Dinamo Tbilisi and Torpedo Kutaisi. First legs played on 25 September 2013, with the returning leg on 30 October 2013.

Quarter final 
First legs played on 22 February 2014, with the returning leg on 20 March 2014.

First legs

Second legs

Semi-final

First legs

Second legs

Final

See also 
 2013–14 Umaglesi Liga
 2013–14 Pirveli Liga

References

External links
 Official site 

Georgian Cup seasons
Cup
Georgian Cup